Ekaterina Makarova and Elena Vesnina were the defending champions, but lost in the quarterfinals to Cara Black and Sania Mirza.Hsieh Su-wei and Peng Shuai won the title, defeating Black and Mirza in the final, 7–6(7–5), 6–2.

Seeds

Draw

Finals

Top half

Bottom half

References
General

Specific

BNP Paribas Open - Women's Doubles
2014 BNP Paribas Open